Kim Byung-chul (born 30 December 1938) is a South Korean businessman and professor. He is best known for donating many relics of Gaya confederacy and Silla to the museum of Yonsei University.

Biography 
He was born in Suncheon in North Korea which was very famous for Christianity, 
He graduated from the Department of Political Science at Yonsei University in 1963. After completing his MBA and PDC(Professional Doctoral Certificate) at the Drexel University, he was a professor at Seokyeong University. He served as CEO of Korea Optical Industry Co., Ltd. and CEO of Century Optics, and is the Chairman of Sunil Co. Ltd., Wooil Co.Ltd., Darim Co. Ltd., and Smarttech Co.Ltd. On 13 May 2016 he donated 1,803 Silla Pagoda and Relics to Yonsei University Museum.

Awards 
 1973 Industrial Packaging Award
 1973 Minister of Commerce Award
 Presidential Award in 1975
 1975 Minister of Defense Award
 1976 Prime Minister Award
 1977 Stone Tower Order of Industrial Service Merit
 2016 Proud Yonsei Award (Achievement Award)

See also 
Yonsei University

External links

MBC Drama 
 1983년 모범 경제인 입지 드라마 방영(MBC)

Books
 (Korean Language) 김병철동문기증: 가야·신라토기 (서울:연세대학교박물관, 2016), (English) Yonsei University Museum, Pottories of Gaya and Silla by Donating Kim Byung-chul, 2016

References 

Yonsei University alumni
Drexel University alumni
1938 births
Living people